Great Southern Football League may refer to:

Great Southern Football League (South Australia)
Great Southern Football League (Western Australia)

See also
Southern Football League (disambiguation)